Commiphora saxicola, also known as rock corkwood, is a shrub species in the genus Commiphora endemic to, and protected in, Namibia. It grows on rock slopes and in gravel plains in an area reaching from the Kunene River south to Helmeringhausen.

The resin of the shrub smells sweet and is used as a thirst suppressant by the Topnaar people. The fruit is edible.

References

External links

Fruits originating in Africa
Endemic flora of Namibia
saxicola